Turan Information Agency is a news agency based in Baku, Azerbaijan. Founded in Azerbaijan SSR in 1990 by a group of journalists who refused to work in the state media. The Agency prepares analytical articles and news materials in three languages: Azerbaijani, English, and Russian. Topics include politics, economy, finance, communication, religion, culture, and sport.

Major international information agencies such as Reuters, Agence France-Presse and BBC share and use information from Turan. The Agency spreads its news live via the Internet, and using periodic bulletin publication.

See also
Media freedom in Azerbaijan

References

External links
Official website

News agencies based in Azerbaijan
Azerbaijani news websites
Mass media companies of Azerbaijan
1990 establishments in Azerbaijan
Mass media in Baku